Moirangthem is a Meitei ethnic family name (surname). People with this family name include:

 Moirangthem Kirti Singh, Indian scholar 
 Moirangthem Inao, Indian playwright
 Moirangthem Maniram Singha, Indian filmmaker
 Moirangthem Nara, Indian politician
 Moirangthem Mandakini Devi, Indian footballer
 Moirangthem Gouramangi Singh, Indian footballer
 Moirangthem Govin Singh, Indian footballer
 Moirangthem Loken Meitei, Indian footballer
 Moirangthem Basanta Singh, Indian footballer
 Moirangthem Jayananda Singh, Indian footballer
 Moirangthem Meghachandra, Indian politician
 Moirangthem Thoiba Singh, Indian footballer